The Kayathar Airport is an unused airport near Kayatharu. This airport was operated as an airbase by Britishers during World War II, later it was left unused and turned to barren land though the airstrip remains undamaged.

Its also easily accessible to train route near the station by KADAMBUR, earlier Britishers making their train foot strips in this route. Now also we can this foot strips in that particular location.

Now this airstrip is taken by the Government of India with plans to construct a new airport under UDAN scheme.

References 

Airports in Tamil Nadu
Defunct airports in India
Thoothukudi district
1940s establishments in British India
Military airbases established in the 1940s
20th-century architecture in India